Jiří Smejkal (born 5 November 1996) is a Czech professional ice hockey forward. He is currently playing with IK Oskarshamn in the Swedish Hockey League (SHL).

Playing career 
Smejkal started his career in the youth setup at HC Ceske Budejovice. He was picked by Medveščak Zagreb in the 2013 KHL draft. In 2014, he headed over the Atlantic to hone his skills in the Western Hockey League (WHL), joining the Moose Jaw Warriors. In his first year with the Warriors, Smejkal made 72 WHL appearances, tallying 12 goals and 20 assists. He also started the 2015-16 campaign playing for the team but was traded to fellow WHL side Kamloops Blazers in January 2016.

On 15 July 2016, Smejkal signed with Medveščak Zagreb of the Kontinental Hockey League (KHL). He left for HC Sparta Praha on 31 January 2017.

International play

Smejkal has represented his country on several occasions, including the under-18 World Championships in 2014, where the Czech Republic won silver, and the under-20 World Championships in 2016.

Career statistics

Regular season and playoffs

International

References

External links 
 

1996 births
Living people
Czech ice hockey left wingers
Kamloops Blazers players
KHL Medveščak Zagreb players
Moose Jaw Warriors players
IK Oskarshamn players
HC Sparta Praha players
Sportspeople from České Budějovice
Tappara players
Lahti Pelicans players
Ice hockey players at the 2022 Winter Olympics
Olympic ice hockey players of the Czech Republic
Czech expatriate ice hockey players in Canada
Czech expatriate ice hockey players in Finland
Czech expatriate ice hockey players in Sweden
Expatriate ice hockey players in Croatia
Czech expatriate sportspeople in Croatia